Matthew Friedman may refer to:

 Matthew Friedman (musician), American musician, singer and performer
 Matthew Friedman (film editor), American film editor and lecturer
 Matthew S. Friedman, American human rights advocate